The Van 't Kruijs Opening is a chess opening defined by the move:
1. e3
It is named after the Dutch player Maarten van 't Kruijs (1813–1885) who won the sixth Dutch championship in 1878.  As this opening move is rarely played, it is considered an irregular opening, and thus it is classified under the A00 code in the Encyclopaedia of Chess Openings.

Discussion
Although there are several examples from games in the 19th century, the Van 't Kruijs Opening is not popular in the modern era and is not a common choice for grandmasters, but its ability to transpose into many different openings explains its attraction for some players such as Pavel Blatny, Aron Nimzowitsch, and Bent Larsen. Benjamin & Schiller (1987) call it a "chameleon." According to ChessBase, it ranks sixth in popularity out of the twenty possible first moves.

The loss of popularity is due to 1.e3 gaining little except as a transposition strategy to reach other positions. The queen's bishop's  is somewhat obstructed by the pawn on e3, and White usually wants to take more than a modest stake of the centre.

Although not very aggressive for a first move, play may transpose to lines of the English Opening (c2–c4), Queen's Pawn Game (d2–d4), or French Defense (delayed d2–d4), reversed Dutch Defense (f2–f4) positions, the modern variation of Larsen's Opening (b2-b3), or the Stonewall Attack.

Black's response

Benjamin & Schiller's (1987) general advice is to watch out for transpositions and suggest a 1...g6 fianchetto response since e3 positions against fianchetto are weak. The most common response after 1.e3 is 1...Nf6, where White generally continues with 2.Nf3, effectively transposing to the Reti Opening. Here, White can either play d4 soon after, potentially transposing to a Queen's Gambit Declined line, but can also deviate with a system similar to the Hedgehog System played by Black, with b3, c4, Nbd2, and Be2. 

If Black responds with 1... d5 or 1...c5, White can respond similarly to 1...Nf6. Even 1...b6!?, 1...g6!?, 1...c6!?, or 1...e6 is completely playable. Another common response is 1...e5, where White usually plays 2.d4, transposing to the French Defense Exchange Variation after 2...exd4 3.exd4 d5. However, either White or Black can deviate, showing the flexibility of this opening. 

Other moves like 1...b5?, 1...g5?!, 1...h5?!, or 1...a5?! are rarely played.

There are also a few experimental moves that can be tried. For example, after 1.e3 e5, White can play 2.e4, therefore making it a reversed Open Game. This is often used when White has much knowledge of the opening when playing as Black. Therefore, this can be used to ensnare a few opponents into traps. However, since this gives the first move advantage to Black straight away, this is not recommended. Similarly, 1.e3 f5 2.e4 goes to a reversed From's Gambit, where White is practically playing as Black.

Variations 

1.e3 Nf6 2.c4 d6 3.Nf3 e5 4.d4 Nbd7 (Sokolsky–Panoff 1936)
1.e3 e5 2.b3 c5 3.Bb2 Nc6 4.Nf3 e4 5.Ne5 d6 6.Nxc6 bxc6 7.d3 Nf6 8.dxe4 Nxe4 9.Bd3 Qa5+
1.e3 e5 2.c4 d6 3.Nc3 Nc6 4.b3 Nf6 (Amsterdam Attack)
1.e3 e5 2.Nc3 d5 3.f4 exf4 4.Nf3
1.e3 e5 2.Nc3 d5 3.d4 exd4 4.Qxd4 Nf6 5.e4 Nc6 6.Bb5 Bd7 7.Bxc6 Bxc6 8.e5 Ne4 9.Nxe4 dxe4 10.Ne2 Be7 11.Be3 Qxd4 12.Nxd4 Bd7 (Nimzovitchz–Tarrasch 1928)
1.e3 e5 2.Nc3 d5 3.d4 exd4 4.Qxd4 Nf6 5.e4 dxe4 6.Qxd8+ Kxd8 7.Bg5 Bf5 8.O-O-O+ Nd7 9.Nce2
1.e3 e5 2.Nc3 Nc6 3.f4 exf4 4.Nf3
1.e3 e5 2.Nc3 Nf6 3.f4 exf4 4.Nf3
1.e3 e5 2.Nc3 Nf6 3.Be2 d5 4.d4 exd4 (Horing–Paulsen 1863)
1.e3 e5 2.Bc4 d5 3.Bb3
1.e3 d5 2.Nc3 Nf6 3.a3 e5 4.f4 exf4 5.Nf3
1.e3 f5 2.g3 Nf6 3.Bg2 e5 4.Ne2 d5 (Wisker–Bird 1873)
1.e3 b6 2.b3 Bb7 3.Bb2 d6 4.d4 Nf6 (Mason–Winawer 1881)

See also
 List of chess openings
 List of chess openings named after people

Notes

References

Further reading

External links

Short biography of Maarten van 't Kruijs
The chess games of Maarten van 't Kruijs

Chess openings